Warwick Abrahim (born 4 July 1990) is a South African  cricketer, who played for North West in first-class, List A and T20 cricket.

References 

1990 births
Living people
South African cricketers
Boland cricketers
North West cricketers